Bhavya Creations is an Indian film production studio. It was launched in 2007 by V. Ananda Prasad.

Film production

References

External links
 

Indian companies established in 2007
Film production companies based in Hyderabad, India
2007 establishments in Andhra Pradesh